William Long may refer to:

Politicians
 William Long (fl.1388), MP for Barnstaple
 William Long (died c.1426), MP and Mayor for Rye
 William Long (mayor) (1781–1851), mayor of Columbus, Ohio
 William Long (New South Wales politician) (1839–1915), race-horse owner and Colonial Treasurer of New South Wales
 William Long (Australian politician) (1885–1957), member of the Australian Parliament for Lang
 William Long (Northern Ireland politician) (1922–2008), Unionist politician in Northern Ireland
 William Houston Long (1843–1912), member of the Queensland Legislative Council
 Brock Long (born 1975), full name William Brockmann Long, Administrator of the U.S. Federal Emergency Management Agency

Others
 William J. Long (1867–1952), American nature writer
 William Ivey Long (born 1947), American costume designer
 William Long (rowing) (1935–2010), American Olympic athlete
 William Long (surgeon) (1747–1818), English surgeon
 Private William Long, murdered in the 2009 Little Rock recruiting office shooting
 William Long (priest) (died 1835), Canon of Windsor
 William Henry Long (1867–1947), American mycologist
 Will West Long (c. 1869–1947), Cherokee mask maker, a translator, and a Cherokee cultural historian

See also
Bill Long (disambiguation)